Khaab Toot Jaatay Hain is a Pakistani television historical drama mini series co-produced by Bilal Ashraf and Mohammed Ehteshamuddin under banner Behive Transmedia. The story is based on the book The Wastes of Times by Syed Sajjad Hussain who was vice chancellor in Dhaka University in 1970s and story follows his memoir about the Fall of Dhaka. The screenplay is written by Amjad Islam Amjad. The series started airing weekly on Hum TV on 27 December 2021.

Cast 
 Mohammed Ehteshamuddin as Professor Syed Sajjad Hussain
 Nadeem Baig as Education secretary general
 Kulsoom Aftab as Mrs. Sajjad
 Peerzada Salman
 Noor ul Hassan as Professor Aanand
 Syed Mohammad Ahmed as Cief of Police
 Saleem Mairaj as Doctor
 Eman Ahmed as younger daughter of Sajjad
 Hania Ahmed as elder daughter of Sajjad
 Noreen Gulwani as a University student from West Pakistan
 Saad Fareedi as Separatist of Mukti Bahini
 Sunil Shankar as Separatist of Mukti Bahini
 Ali Rizvi
 Sharjil Baloch
 Nazar ul Hasan
 Hammad Siddique
 Manan Hameed
 Shabir Bhatti

Production 
The series is based on the book The Wastes of Times by Dr. Sajid Hussain which is about his memos about the events of Fall of Dhaka. The screenplay is written by famous poet and author Amjad Islam Amjad. The series marked his return on television as a writer after several years as he wrote claasic plays such as Waris and Dehleez for the television back in 1970s to 1990s.

In September 2021, Bilal Ashraf announced that he will venture into production with his newly found "Behive Transmedia", a production house that he co-owns along with filmmaker and actor, Mohammed Ehteshamuddin. Thus, the series marks Ashraf's debut as a producer. It also marks Ehteshamuddin's return on television as a director after period-drama Aangan (2018) and as an actor after Yaqeen Ka Safar (2017).

Soundtracks

References 

Pakistani television dramas based on novels
Hum TV original programming
2021 Pakistani television series debuts
2022 Pakistani television series endings
Works about the Bangladesh Liberation War
Pakistani period television series